Platymantis is a genus of frogs in the family Ceratobatrachidae. They are commonly known as wrinkled ground frogs, ground frogs, and forest frogs.

As currently defined, Platymantis is a large genus with up to as many as 60 species found mostly in the Philippines. However, it is known to be paraphyletic. Solving this problem will likely lead to a more narrowly defined Platymantis, possibly by transferring some species to a larger Ceratobatrachus (with Batrachylodes).

Species
There are currently at least 30 extant species in this genus. Brown, et al. (2015) estimates that there may be a total of 50-60 species in Platymantis if all cryptic species were to be described.

In addition, there is an extinct species:
 Platymantis megabotoniviti, Giant Fiji ground frog

Species moved to genus Cornufer
Brown, et al. (2015) moved the Platymantis species of Oceania into the newly proposed genus Cornufer. Species in the Philippines remained in Platymantis.

 Cornufer aculeodactylus Brown, 1952
 Cornufer admiraltiensis Richards, Mack & Austin, 2007
 Cornufer akarithymus Brown & Tyler, 1968
 Cornufer batantae Zweifel, 1969
 Cornufer bimaculatus Günther, 1999
 Cornufer boulengeri (Boettger, 1892)
 Cornufer browni Allison & Kraus, 2001
 Cornufer bufonulus Kraus and Allison, 2007
 Cornufer caesiops Kraus and Allison, 2009
 Cornufer cheesmanae Parker, 1940
 Cornufer citrinospilus Brown, Richards, and Broadhead, 2013
 Cornufer cryptotis Günther, 1999
 Cornufer desticans Brown & Richards, 2008
 Cornufer gilliardi Zweifel, 1960
 Cornufer guppyi (Boulenger, 1884)
 Cornufer latro Richards, Mack & Austin, 2007
 Cornufer macrops (Brown, 1965)
 Cornufer macrosceles Zweifel, 1975
 Cornufer magnus Brown & Menzies, 1979 (synonym: Platymantis magna)
 Cornufer mamusiorum Foufopoulos and Brown, 2004
 Cornufer manus Kraus and Allison, 2009
 Cornufer mimica Brown & Tyler, 1968
 Cornufer nakanaiorum Brown, Foufopoulos, and Richards, 2006
 Cornufer neckeri (Brown & Myers, 1949)
 Cornufer nexipus Zweifel, 1975
 Cornufer papuensis Meyer, 1875
 Cornufer parilis Brown & Richards, 2008
 Cornufer parkeri (Brown, 1965)
 Cornufer pelewensis Peters, 1867
 Cornufer punctatus Peters & Doria, 1878
 Cornufer schmidti Brown & Tyler, 1968
 Cornufer solomonis (Boulenger, 1884)
 Cornufer sulcatus Kraus and Allison, 2007
 Cornufer vitianus (Duméril, 1853)
 Cornufer vitiensis (Girard, 1853)
 Cornufer weberi Schmidt, 1932
 Cornufer wuenscheorum Günther, 2006

Endemic ranges
Many Platymantis species are endemic to highly restricted geographical areas within the Philippines.
Widespread
 Platymantis corrugatus
 Platymantis dorsalis
Luzon
Northern Luzon
 Platymantis cagayanensis: Palaui Island; NE Luzon
 Platymantis sierramadrensis: Sierra Madre
 Platymantis taylori: Sierra Madre
 Platymantis cornutus: Cordillera Central (Luzon)
 Platymantis subterrestris: Cordillera Central (Luzon)
 Platymantis pygmaeus: northern Luzon
Central Luzon
 Platymantis biak: Biak-na-Bato National Park
 Platymantis polillensis: Polillo Island; Aurora Province
 Platymantis mimula: Mount Makiling
 Platymantis banahao: Mount Banahaw
 Platymantis indeprensus: Mount Banahaw
 Platymantis montanus: Mount Banahaw
 Platymantis naomii: Mount Banahaw
 Platymantis pseudodorsalis: Mount Banahaw
 Platymantis quezoni: Quezon Protected Landscape
Bicol Region
 Platymantis isarog: Mount Isarog
 Platymantis diesmosi: Malinao Volcano
 Platymantis luzonensis: SE Luzon
Visayas
 Platymantis lawtoni: Romblon
 Platymantis levigata: Romblon
 Platymantis insulatus: South Gigante Island near Panay
 Platymantis paengi: Pandan, Antique, Panay
 Platymantis panayensis: Panay
 Platymantis negrosensis: Panay; Negros
 Platymantis hazelae: Negros
 Platymantis spelaea: southern Negros
 Platymantis bayani: Taft, Eastern Samar
 Platymantis rabori: Bohol; Leyte; Mindanao
 Platymantis guentheri: Bohol; Leyte; Mindanao

References

External links
BITC / Species Descriptions - Example Platymantis

 
Ceratobatrachidae
Amphibians of Asia
Amphibians of the Philippines
Amphibians of Oceania
Amphibian genera
Taxa named by Albert Günther